There have been four NRL Women's premiership seasons. Each season, the tournament is decided by a grand final. This is a list of all the grand finals that were played to decide those premierships.

List

Team performance

See also 

 List of NRL Grand finals

References 

Grand Finals
Women's Grand finals
NRL Grand finals